Madoryx bubastus is a moth of the  family Sphingidae. It is found in Central America (including Costa Rica and Guatemala) and South America, including 
French Guiana and Venezuela south to at least Bolivia and Argentina. It is also present in Mexico.

The wingspan is 92–120 mm. The upperside of the body and wings are olive-brown. There is a small, rounded or ovate, upper silver discal spot on the forewing upperside.

Adults are probably on wing year round.

The larvae have been recorded feeding on Guettarda macrosperma. Pupation takes place in a flimsy cocoon amongst leaf litter.

Subspecies
Madoryx bubastus bubastus
Madoryx bubastus butleri (Kirby, 1877) (Mexico, Guatemala and Belize)

References

Dilophonotini
Moths described in 1777